This was the fourth season for the League Cup, which was again known as the Players No.6 Trophy for sponsorship reasons.

Bradford Northern won the trophy by beating Widnes by the score of 3–2. The final was played at Wilderspool, Warrington. The attendance was 5,935 and receipts were £3305.

Background 
This season saw no changes in the  entrants, no new members and no withdrawals, the number remaining at eighteen.
For the  first time in the competition, there were no drawn matches.

Competition and results

Round 1 - First round 

Involved 16 matches and 32 clubs

Round 2 - Second round 

Involved  8 matches and 16 clubs

Round 3 -Quarterfinals

Involved 4 matches with 8 clubs

Round 4 – Semifinals 

Involved 2 matches and 4 clubs

Final

Teams and scorers 

Scoring - Try = three points - Goal = two points - Drop goal = one point

Timeline in the final

Prize money 
As part of the sponsorship deal and funds, the  prize money awarded to the competing teams for this season is as follows :-

Note - the  author is unable to trace the  rest of the  award amounts. Can anyone help ?

Notes and comments 
1 * The News of The World/Empire News annual 1975–76 gives the score as 15-10 but others including The John Player Yearbook 1975–76 give it as 15-6
2 * Lock Lane are a Junior (amateur) club from Castleford
3 * The John Player Yearbook 1975–76 gives the attendance as 1,000 but the Rothmans Rugby League Yearbooks 1990-91 and 1991–92, and RUGBYLEAGUEproject and Wigan official archives give it as 537
4 * Wigan official archives gives the  score as 12-6 but The News of The World/Empire News annual 1975–76, RUGBYLEAGUEproject and The John Player Yearbook 1975–76 gives it as 12-8
5 * Kippax White Swan are a Junior (amateur) club from Castleford
6 * The John Player Yearbook 1975–76 gives the attendance as 513 but Rothmans Rugby League Yearbooks 1990-91 and 1991-92  and RUGBYLEAGUEproject give it as 453
7 * The News of The World/Empire News annual 1975–76, Wigan official archives and RUGBYLEAGUEproject  give the score as 21-14   but The John Player Yearbook 1975–76 give it as 22-14
8 * Hull F.C. official website shows Hull playing away at Leeds in December in the JPT, an obvious error
9 * Swinton No 8 Brian Butler was sent off in the 36th minute for "interfering in a tackle by Green on David Hill" and Wigan hooker Colin Clarke was sent off in the 6th minute for dissent.
10 * The News of The World/Empire News annual 1975–76 gives the score as 13-6  but Wigan official archives,  RUGBYLEAGUEproject and The John Player Yearbook 1975–76  give it as 33-6
11 * The News of The World/Empire News annual 1975–76 gives the score as 13-6  but Wigan official archives,  RUGBYLEAGUEproject and The John Player Yearbook 1975–76  give it as 33-6
13  * Wilderspool was the home ground of Warrington from 1883 to the end of the 2003 Summer season when they moved into the new purpose-built Halliwell Jones Stadium. Wilderspool remained as a sports/Ruugby League ground and is/was used by Woolston Rovers/Warrington Wizards junior club. 
The ground had a final capacity of 9,000 although the record attendance was set in a Challenge cup third round match on 13 March 1948 when 34,304 spectators saw Warrington lose to Wigan 10–13.

General information for those unfamiliar 
The council of the Rugby Football League voted to introduce a new competition, to be similar to The Football Association and Scottish Football Association's "League Cup". It was to be a similar knock-out structure to, and to be secondary to, the Challenge Cup. As this was being formulated, sports sponsorship was becoming more prevalent and as a result John Player and Sons, a division of Imperial Tobacco Company, became sponsors, and the competition never became widely known as the "League Cup" 
The competition ran from 1971–72 until 1995-96 and was initially intended for the professional clubs plus the two amateur BARLA National Cup finalists. In later seasons the entries were expanded to take in other amateur and French teams. The competition was dropped due to "fixture congestion" when Rugby League became a summer sport
The Rugby League season always (until the onset of "Summer Rugby" in 1996) ran from around August-time through to around May-time and this competition always took place early in the season, in the Autumn, with the final usually taking place in late January 
The competition was variably known, by its sponsorship name, as the Player's No.6 Trophy (1971–1977), the John Player Trophy (1977–1983), the John Player Special Trophy (1983–1989), and the Regal Trophy in 1989.

See also 
1974–75 Northern Rugby Football League season
1974 Lancashire Cup
1974 Yorkshire Cup
Player's No.6 Trophy
Rugby league county cups

References

External links
Saints Heritage Society
1896–97 Northern Rugby Football Union season at wigan.rlfans.com 
Hull&Proud Fixtures & Results 1896/1897
Widnes Vikings - One team, one passion Season In Review - 1896-97
The Northern Union at warringtonwolves.org
Huddersfield R L Heritage
Wakefield until I die

1974 in English rugby league
1975 in English rugby league
League Cup (rugby league)